Alan O'Connor may refer to:
 Alan O'Connor (Gaelic footballer)
 Alan O'Connor (rugby union)